Brian Percival is a British film director, known for his work on the British television series Downton Abbey and North & South, as well as the feature film The Book Thief.

Biography
He was born in Liverpool, England, in 1962 and attended New Heys Comprehensive School from 1973 to 1980. From film school, he joined Cinequip subsidiary Percival Smith Associates with Tony Smith, respected commercials producer  to become a highly successful Commercials director. He has directed Pleasureland, North and South, ShakespeaRe-Told (Much Ado About Nothing), (for which he won his second Bafta), The Ruby in the Smoke and The Old Curiosity Shop.

His nine-minute short About a Girl won the BAFTA Award for Best Short Film and several film festival awards in 2001.

Since 2010 he has directed seven episodes of the ITV British  period drama, Downton Abbey. For his work on the show he won the 2010 BAFTA Craft award for Best Fiction Director and the 2011 Primetime Emmy Award for Outstanding Directing for a Miniseries, Movie or a Dramatic Special. In 2012, he was nominated for a  Primetime Emmy Award for Outstanding Directing for a Drama Series for "Episode 7". He also directed the 2013 film, The Book Thief.

Filmography

References

External links
 

English film directors
English television directors
Primetime Emmy Award winners
Living people
Place of birth missing (living people)
Year of birth missing (living people)